First Baptist Church (also known as Mountain Valley Church) is a historic church at 408 State Avenue in Alamosa, Colorado. It was built in 1907 and was added to the National Register of Historic Places in 2005.

Its exterior is concrete blocks, painted. The church has a complex roofline, although the basic form of the church is rectangular.

The building is now the home to the "Pentecostal Church of God International Movement of the Rocky Mountains".

References

Baptist churches in Colorado
Churches on the National Register of Historic Places in Colorado
Churches completed in 1907
Buildings and structures in Alamosa, Colorado
National Register of Historic Places in Alamosa County, Colorado
Churches in Colorado
Ornamental block buildings